José Carlos Pereira de Almeida Torres, 2nd Viscount of Macaé, ( — 25 April 1850) was a Brazilian magistrate and politician, who served as Prime Minister of Brazil in 1848.

Biography
He was the son of judge José Carlos Pereira, and of Ana Zeferina de Almeida Torres. He married his cousin Eudóxia Engrácia de Almeida Torres, leaving offspring.

After graduating in law, he served as a magistrate in Paraná, Minas Gerais and Bahia, having attained the degree of Judge in Bahia. He was a deputy general for Minas Gerais (8 May 1826 - 3 September 1829) for Bahia (3 May 1830- 6 October 1833) and for São Paulo (1 January 1843 - 13 June 1843); governor of Rio Grande do Sul (January 8 to March 29, 1831) and São Paulo (January 13 - March 9, 1829, October 10, 1829 - April 15, 1830 and August 17, 1842 - January 27, 1843), Minister of Justice, Minister of the Empire, President of the Council of Ministers (Prime Minister) and senator of the Empire of Brazil from 20 June 1843 to 25 April 1850.

His noble title derived from the municipality of Macaé where he was a wealthy farmer who owned the Fazenda Saudade, where he produced coffee and sugar.

He died in 1850, victim of the fever epidemic that periodically ravaged the country. He was buried in the Church of Nossa Senhora da Conceição, in Niterói.

Titles and honours
He became Viscount in 1829, obtaining the Grandeur de Macaé in 1847. He was also a Gentleman of the Imperial Chamber of His Majesty's Council, and commander of the Imperial Order of Christ, among others.

References

1799 births
1856 deaths
Prime Ministers of Brazil
Brazilian nobility
Governors of Rio Grande do Sul
Governors of São Paulo (state)
Members of the Chamber of Deputies (Brazil)